is a generic term for a venerated religious object in Japanese Buddhism. It may take the form of a scroll or statuary. The term  typically refers to the mainstream use of venerated objects within Nichiren Buddhism, referring to the calligraphic paper mandala inscribed by the 13th Japanese Buddhist priest  Nichiren to which devotional chanting is directed.

Linguistically, the rootword  derives from ancient word , signifying a devotional object of respect or worship, and with the honorific  prefix.  

Varying Nichiren groups accord their own meanings to the term  in different ways, signifying their treatment of the object:

 "Object of Devotion" — Soka Gakkai 
 "Object of Worship" — Nichiren Shōshū 
 "The Great Mandala, Venerated Supreme" — Nichiren-shū sects

The term  is used for statuary.  are often enshrined within an altar shrine.

Description 
He stated that by using  ink to inscribe it, he was acting like a "lion king." Nichiren's calligraphy shifted over the years he inscribed . For example, a  he inscribed in July 1273 was inscribed on a piece of silk . Copies of the original  have been made by others and can be found in varying sizes.

Nichiren and his successors also inscribed smaller  that are carried on the person.

Opinions on its significance 
 Author Philip Yampolsky describes Nichiren's  as a mandala, a concretized object that Nichiren inscribed to transmit what he regarded as the essence of the Lotus Sutra. It is also described as a depiction of the Ceremony in the Air in the 11th chapter of the Lotus Sutra, "The Emergence of the Treasure Tower". It is the first of the "three great secret laws" of Nichiren Buddhism, the others being Nam Myōhō Renge Kyō and the platform of ordination or place of worship. 
 Authors Robert Ellwood and Richard Pilgrim describe  as a "mandala of the cosmos as perceived inwardly by Nichiren." 
 Masaharu Anesaki describes  as "a physical embodiment of the truth of cosmic existence as realized in the all-comprehensive conception of 'mutual participation, and illuminated by the all-enlightening power of the Truth.'" 

Calligraphic meanings 

A Nichiren  is usually written in traditional kanji characters with the addition of two Siddhaṃ scripts.

Most prominent to all such  is the phrase —the primary mantra in Nichiren Buddhism—written down the center in bold calligraphy. Right below, also in bold, Nichiren writes his name followed by his seal. This signifies Nichiren's conviction that his life had manifested the essence of the Lotus Sutra.

On the top row can be found the names of Shakyamuni Buddha and Prabhutaratna and the four leaders of the Bodhisattvas of the Earth. The names of deities believed to protect the Buddha land, called the Four Heavenly Kings (Bishamonten, Jikokuten, Kōmokuten, and Zōjōten), further occupy the four corners, and Sanskrit characters depicting Aizen Myō-ō and Fudō Myō-ō are situated along the left and right outer edges. Within this frame are the names of various Buddhas, bodhisattvas, historical and mythological figures in Buddhism, personages representing the ten realms, and deities drawn from Vedic, Chinese, and Japanese traditions are arranged hierarchically. Each of these names represents some aspect of the Buddha's enlightenment or an important Buddhist concept.

History 
Research has documented that Nichiren inscribed 740 . He began inscribing  immediately before and during his exile on Sado between late 1271 and early 1274. This follows the attempted and failed execution of him at Tatsunokuchi Beach in 1271. In various letters he referred to this event as his "casting off the transient and revealing the true", at which time he claimed to have discarded his transient status and revealed his essential identity as the Buddha of the Latter Day of the Law.

The first extant  was inscribed by Nichiren on 12 October 1271 before his transport to Sado Island. Stone describes it as embryonic in form.

During his exile in Sado Island (1271–1274) Nichiren wrote two treatises explaining the significance of the object of devotion from the theoretical perspectives of the person (The Opening of the Eyes) and the law (The Object of Devotion for Observing the Mind). Nichiren wrote additional letters to his followers bestowing  to them and further explaining their significance: "Letter to Misawa," "Reply to Kyo'o," "The Real Aspect of the Gohonzon," and "On the Treasure Tower."

The  issue of Soka Gakkai 

The Nichiren Shoshu religion claims that the original  mandala at its head temple is the original source of power that is transcribed by the High Priests of Nichiren Shoshu.

By September 1993, the Soka Gakkai began to manufacture their own version and artistic format used today for current members. A  transcribed by Nichikan Shonin, the 26th chief abbot of Taisekiji was selected through one of the dissident breakaway priest who provided the woodblock copy when he sided with President Daisaku Ikeda.

 Former Soka Gakkai President Jōsei Toda described the  simply as "a happiness-producing machine," a means for harmonizing with "universal life force." 

Inscriptions 
The following inscriptions are found in the  transcribed by 26th High Priest Nichikan Shonin, as is the mainstream format also transcribed by the Successive High Priests of Nichiren Shoshu:
 Nichiren Daishonin: — ; "Never in 2,230-some years since the passing of the Buddha has this great mandala appeared in the world." 
 Nichikan Shonin: — ; "The 13th day of the sixth month in the fifth year of Kyoho, cyclical sign kanoe-ne." 

There are also two inscriptions from Miao-lo's commentary , The Annotations on "The Words and Phrases of the Lotus Sutra":

  — "Those who make offerings will gain good fortune surpassing the ten honorable titles [of the Buddha]" 
  — "Those who vex and trouble [the practitioners of the Law] will have their heads split into seven pieces."

The Soka Gakkai organization maintains that only the  conferred by their leadership brings both personal happiness and Kosen-rufu, claiming that they possess the true mandate of Nichiren for widespread propagation.

Outside of Nichiren Buddhism

In the Japanese new religion Risshō Kōsei Kai, members receive and practice to a  enshrined in their homes; the scroll consists of an image of Gautama Buddha. At the Risshō Kōsei Kai headquarters there is a  that is a statue of Shakyamuni.

In the Jōdo Shinshū school of Pure Land Buddhism, under Hōnen and Shinran, the use of  became more prevalent; they took the form of inscriptions of the sect's mantra Namu Amida Buddha, other phrases, images of the Buddha, statuary, and even representations of the founder. Rennyo thought the written mantra was more appropriate than a statue but did not ascribe particular powers to it as do Nichiren's followers to their .

In Mikkyō practices such as in Shingon Buddhism, the term  to refers to the divinity honored in a rite but later came to represent the formal object of worship.  The tutelary figure's role is similar to that of the yidam in Tibetan Buddhism. Tutelary deities in Vajrayana, including Mikkyō, Chinese Esoteric Buddhism and Tibetan Buddhism, are crucial to many religious practices. In the famous  fire ritual ceremony, the fire itself, while it is being consumed and animated, is also considered a temporary .

See also

Notes

Further reading
 Ikeda, D. (2012). Lectures on The Opening of the Eyes. World Tribune Press. 
 Ikeda, D. et al. (2004). The World of Nichiren Daishonin's Writings, Volume 2. . Two editions: Eternal Ganges Press and Soka Gakkai Malaysia
 Lotus Seeds, The Essence Of Nichiren Shu Buddhism, Nichiren Buddhist Temple of San Jose. 
 McCormick, R. The Three Great Hidden Dharmas. http://www.nichiren-shu.org/Sanfrancisco/pages/study/nine.htm

Buddhist ritual implements
Nichiren Buddhism